This list documents all 998 mythical, historical and notable women whose names are displayed on the handmade white tiles of the Heritage Floor as part of Judy Chicago's The Dinner Party art installation (1979); there is also one man listed, Kresilas, who was mistakenly included in the installation as he was thought to have been a woman called Cresilla. The names appear as they are spelled on the floor. Since 2007 the installation has been on permanent exhibition in the Elizabeth A. Sackler Center for Feminist Art at the Brooklyn Museum, New York.

This is a sortable list. Click on the column headers to reorder.

Notes

References 
 Chicago, Judy. The Dinner Party: From Creation to Preservation. London: Merrell (2007). 
 Gallick, Sarah. The Big Book of Women Saints. New York: HarperOne (2007). 
 Hurd-Mead, Kate Campbell. A History of Women in Medicine: From the Earliest Times to the Beginning of the Nineteenth Century. Self Published (1938).
 Windsor, Laura. Women in Medicine: An Encyclopedia. Santa Barbara: ABC-CLIO (2002). 

Feminism and history
Feminism and the arts
Lists by name
Lists of women